Broadway–City Hall is an underground station on the Canada Line of Metro Vancouver's SkyTrain rapid transit system. The station is located at the intersection of West Broadway and Cambie Street in Vancouver, British Columbia and is within walking distance of Vancouver City Hall, City Square Shopping Centre, Vancouver General Hospital and related facilities, as well as the surrounding Fairview and Mount Pleasant neighbourhoods.

History
Broadway–City Hall station was built in 2009 and opened along with the rest of the Canada Line. The station features large double-height ceilings over the platform area and was designed by the architecture firm VIA Architecture.

In 2018, it was confirmed that the Millennium Line would be extended from its current terminus at VCC–Clark station west to Arbutus Street, and eventually to the University of British Columbia. When completed, Broadway–City Hall station will become a transfer point on the Broadway extension as the station was designed with a "knock-out" panel on the mezzanine level to provide a connection to the Millennium Line platforms under Broadway. Originally scheduled to open in 2025, the opening of the new platforms was pushed back to 2026 in November 2022.

Services
Broadway–City Hall station is served by a number of bus routes, including the #9 trolleybus route providing east–west local service along Broadway, the #15 serving Cambie Street, and the 99 B-Line operating east to Commercial–Broadway station and west to the University of British Columbia (UBC).

Station information

Station layout

Entrances
Broadway–City Hall is served by a single entrance at the southeast corner of Cambie Street and West Broadway. The 99 B-Line to Commercial–Broadway station stops in front of this entrance.

The Crossroads development at the northwest corner of Cambie Street and West Broadway was required by the City of Vancouver to provide space for an entrance to the station. This entrance has yet to be built.

Transit connections

The following bus routes can be found in close proximity to Broadway–City Hall station:

References

Canada Line stations
Railway stations in Canada opened in 2009
Buildings and structures in Vancouver
2009 establishments in British Columbia